Jack Berry may refer to:

 Jack Berry (journalist) (born 1931/1932), American sports journalist
 Jack Berry (hurler) (1944–2003), Irish hurler

See also
 Jack Barry (disambiguation)